The March of Tuscany was a march of the Kingdom of Italy and the Holy Roman Empire during the Middle Ages. Located in northwestern central Italy, it bordered the Papal States to the south, the Ligurian Sea to the west and Lombardy to the north. It comprised a collection of counties, largely in the valley of the Arno River, originally centered on Lucca.

History 
The march was a Carolingian creation, a successor of the Lombard duchy of Tuscia. After the fall of the Western Roman Empire, Tuscia from 568 had been part of the Italian Kingdom of the Lombards (Langobardia Major) until, in 754, the Frankish kings intervened in the conflict with Pope Stephen II. By the Donation of Pepin, the southern part of Tuscia around Viterbo became part of the newly established Papal States, while the northern part (or Lombard Tuscany) developed into the Imperial March of Tuscany after Charlemagne had finally conquered the Lombard kingdom in 773/74. Lombardy proper became the nucleus of the Imperial kingdom of Italy, together with the marches of Tuscany and Verona.

The first Tuscan margrave was Adalbert I, who was granted that title in 846. Before him, his father and grandfather, Count Boniface I of Lucca and Boniface II, probably of Bavarian origin, had controlled most of the counties of the region and had held higher titles as well, such as Prefect of Corsica or Duke of Lucca. The Bonifacii held the march until 931. During the late ninth and early tenth century, the support of the margraves of Tuscany was instrumental for any candidate intent on becoming King of Italy.

In 931, Hugh of Arles, who had made himself King of Italy, dispossessed the Bonifacii in an attempt to consolidate all the important fiefs of Italy in his relatives' hands. He granted Tuscany to his brother Boso. It remained in the hands of members of the family known as the Bosonids down to 1001. It also retained its influence regarding royal elections. As late as 1027, Rainier was deposed from the march by Holy Roman Emperor Conrad II for opposing him as king.

In 1027, the duchy was granted to the counts of Canossa. Boniface III used the title : duke and margrave. He was an ally of the Holy Roman Emperors, but his power was so great that he threatened that of the Emperors in Italy. He united the Canossa inheritance, which was largely in the Emilia, to Tuscany and passed it on to his daughter Matilda. Besides her vast Emilian allods, her greatest possession was  Tuscany, held in feudal tenure, and she wielded it to the benefit of the Papacy in the Investiture Controversy. With Matilda's death in 1115, the era of the feudal princes had passed in northern Italy, to be replaced by the dominance of the city-states, maritime republics and communes.

See also
 List of rulers of Tuscany
 Italian city-states

Notes

Sources 
 Wickham, Chris. Early Medieval Italy: Central Power and Local Society 400–1000. MacMillan Press: 1981.

Kingdom of Italy (Holy Roman Empire)
Tuscany
History of Tuscany
846 establishments
Marches of the Holy Roman Empire
Former monarchies of Europe